Richard Davenport (born 12 September 1985) is an English former sprinter who specialised in the 400 metres. He won a silver medal in the 4 × 400 metres relay at the 2005 European Indoor Championships.

His personal bests in the event are 46.75 seconds outdoors (Birmingham 2012) and 47.30 seconds indoors (Birmingham 2005).

International competitions

Personal bests

Outdoor
400 metres – 46.75 (Birmingham 2012)
800 metres – 1:50.17 (Street 2005)
400 metres hurdles – 49.76 (Birmingham 2011)
Indoor
400 metres – 47.30 (Birmingham 2005)
800 metres – 1:51.45 (Cardiff 2005)

References

1985 births
Living people
English male sprinters
British male sprinters
English male hurdlers
Competitors at the 2011 Summer Universiade